Samadhi Sound (or samadhisound) is an independent record label founded by singer and musician David Sylvian after his departure from Virgin Records in the late nineties.

The label mainly serves as a platform for Sylvian to release his own work – the album Blemish was the first to appear on Samadhi Sound in 2003 – and that of artists usually associated to him, like his brother Steve Jansen and Harold Budd. Nine Horses, a collaboration between Sylvian, Jansen, and Burnt Friedman, released their 2005 album  Snow Borne Sorrow on Samadhi Sound.

Artists
 Derek Bailey
 Jan Bang
 Harold Budd
 Thomas Feiner
 Steve Jansen
 Toshimaru Nakamura
 Nine Horses
 Akira Rabelais
 David Sylvian
 David Toop

Releases
 SS001: David Sylvian - Blemish
 SS002: David Sylvian & Ryuichi Sakamoto - World Citizen
 SS003: Akira Rabelais - Spellewauerynsherde
 SS004: Harold Budd - Avalon Sutra / As Long as I Can Hold My Breath
 SS005: David Sylvian - The Good Son vs. The Only Daughter (The Blemish Remixes)
 SS006: Nine Horses - Snow Borne Sorrow
 SS007: Nine Horses - Wonderful World
 SS008: Derek Bailey - To Play - The Blemish Sessions
 SS009: David Toop - Sound Body
 SS010: Nine Horses - Money for All
 SS011: David Sylvian - When Loud Weather Buffeted Naoshima
 SS012: Steve Jansen - Slope
 SS013: Thomas Feiner & Anywhen - The Opiates - Revised
 SS014: The World Is Everything Tour Book Sampler CD
 SS015: Sweet Billy Pilgrim - Twice Born Men
 SS016: David Sylvian - Manafon
 SS017: Toshimaru Nakamura - Egrets
 SS018: Jan Bang - ...And Poppies from Kandahar
 SS019: Akira Rabelais - Caduceus
 SS020: David Sylvian - Sleepwalkers (remix compilation CD)
 SS021: David Sylvian - Died in the Wool – Manafon Variations
 SS022: Jan Bang & Erik Honore - Uncommon Deities
 SS023: Stephan Mathieu & David Sylvian - Wandermüde
 SS024: David Sylvian - there's a light that enters houses with no other house in sight
 SOUND-DL001: Harold Budd - Perhaps
 SOUND-DL002: Steve Jansen - Swimming in Qualia (Ascent)
 SOUND-DL003: Steve Jansen - Slope Remixes
 SOUND-DL004: Steve Jansen - The Occurrence of Slope
 SOUND10-001: David Sylvian - Do You Know Me Now? (10" Ltd Vinyl)
 SSDVD01: David Sylvian - Amplified Gesture (DVD Documentary)
 SOUND-OP001: David Sylvian - Hypergraphia - The Writings of David Sylvian 1980 - 2014 (Book of lyrics, poems & interviews)

See also
 List of record labels

External links
 Official website of samadhi sound

 
British record labels
Ambient music record labels